The 1986 Asian Basketball Confederation Championship for Women were held in Kuala Lumpur, Malaysia

Preliminary round

Group A

Group B

Final round 

 The results and the points of the matches between the same teams that were already played during the preliminary round shall be taken into account for the final round.

Classification 7th–10th

Championship

Final standing

Awards

References
 Results
FIBA Archive

1986
1986 in women's basketball
women
International women's basketball competitions hosted by Malaysia
B